Yegor Dmitriyevich Noskov (born 24 March 2003) is a Russian football player who plays as a left back for CSKA Moscow.

Career
Noskov made his debut in the Russian Premier League for CSKA Moscow on 5 March 2023 in a game against Sochi.

References

External links
 
 
 

2003 births
Footballers from Moscow
Living people
Russian footballers
Association football midfielders
PFC CSKA Moscow players
Russian Premier League players